The Canton of Tôtes is a former canton situated in the Seine-Maritime département and in the Haute-Normandie region of northern France. It was disbanded following the French canton reorganisation which came into effect in March 2015. It had a total of 13,342 inhabitants (2012).

Geography 
An area of farming and associated light industry in the arrondissement of Dieppe, centred on the village of Tôtes. The altitude varies from 69m (Saint-Pierre-Bénouville) to 176m (Fresnay-le-Long) for an average altitude of 134m.

The canton comprised 22 communes:

Auffay
Beauval-en-Caux
Belleville-en-Caux
Bertrimont
Biville-la-Baignarde
Bracquetuit
Calleville-les-Deux-Églises
Étaimpuis
La Fontelaye
Fresnay-le-Long
Gonneville-sur-Scie
Imbleville
Montreuil-en-Caux
Saint-Denis-sur-Scie
Saint-Maclou-de-Folleville
Saint-Pierre-Bénouville
Saint-Vaast-du-Val
Saint-Victor-l'Abbaye
Tôtes
Val-de-Saâne
Varneville-Bretteville
Vassonville

Population

See also 
 Arrondissements of the Seine-Maritime department
 Cantons of the Seine-Maritime department
 Communes of the Seine-Maritime department

References

Totes
2015 disestablishments in France
States and territories disestablished in 2015